Baldwin I (probably 830s – 879), also known as Baldwin Iron Arm (the epithet is first recorded in the 12th century), was the first margrave of Flanders, which evolved into the County of Flanders.

He was the son of Odoacer. Odoacer was the son of Enguerrand delle Fiandre. Enguerrand delle Fiandre was the son of Liederik.

Elopement with princess
At the time Baldwin first appears in the records he was already a count, presumably in the area of Flanders, but this is not known. Count Baldwin rose to prominence when he eloped with Judith, daughter of Charles the Bald, king of West Francia. Judith had previously been married to Æthelwulf and Æthelbald, kings of Wessex, but after the latter's death in 860, she returned to France.

Around the Christmas of 861, at the instigation of Baldwin and with her brother Louis's consent, Judith escaped the custody into which she had been placed in the city of Senlis, Oise after her return from England. She fled north with Count Baldwin. Charles had given no permission for a marriage and tried to capture Baldwin, sending letters to Rorik of Dorestad and Bishop Hungar, forbidding them to shelter the fugitive.

After Baldwin and Judith had evaded his attempts to capture them, Charles had his bishops excommunicate the couple. Judith and Baldwin responded by travelling to Rome to plead their case with Pope Nicholas I. By 23 November 862, their plea was successful in that they had won the support of Pope Nicholas. In June 863 Rodoald, Bishop of Porto in Italy and John, Bishop of Cervia were sent by Pope Nicholas to pressure King Charles into consenting to Judith and Baldwin's marriage.  Later that year they were allowed to return to Francia and get married in  the cathedral in Auxerre. Charles the Bald refused to attend either the betrothal or the marriage, but he restored Baldwin to all his previous honors.

King Charles appointed Baldwin Margrave of Flanders, responsible for repelling the Viking invasions. Some theorize Charles did this in the hope that Baldwin would be killed. Baldwin was very successful in the position and used it to build his domain. By 870, in addition to Flanders, Baldwin had acquired the lay-abbacy of Saint Peter's Abbey in Ghent and is assumed to have also acquired the county of Waasland, or parts thereof by this time.

Issue
Baldwin I and Judith had:
 Charles, who was named after his maternal grandfather but died at a young age
 Baldwin II (c. 866 – 918), who succeeded as margrave of Flanders
 Ralph (c. 869 – murdered 896), who became count of Cambrai around 888; he and his brother joined King Zwentibold of Lotharingia in 895, attacked Vermandois and captured Arras, Saint-Quentin and Peronne, and ended up captured and killed by Herbert I of Vermandois
 Guinidilda, who married Wilfred I the Hairy, Count of Barcelona.

Career
Baldwin developed himself as a very faithful and stout supporter of Charles and played an important role in the continuing wars against the Vikings. He is named in 877 as one of those willing to support the emperor's son, Louis the Stammerer. During his life, Baldwin expanded his territory into one of the major principalities of Western Francia. He died in 879 and was buried in the Abbey of St-Bertin, near Saint-Omer.

References

Sources

External links
 Baldwin I of Flanders
 Counts of Flanders
 

830s births
879 deaths
Year of birth uncertain
House of Flanders
Frankish warriors
Counts of Ternois
Baldwin 1
9th-century people from West Francia
People temporarily excommunicated by the Catholic Church
Husbands of Judith of Flanders